Claude Peter Magrath (born April 23, 1933) is a higher education administrator who has served as provost or president at multiple American universities. 

Magrath was born on April 23, 1933, in Brooklyn, New York and received political science degrees as an undergraduate at the University of New Hampshire and as a Ph.D. at Cornell University. He began his teaching and administrative career at Brown University during 1961–68 and later served as interim president at the University of Nebraska (where he was provost and held other positions, 1968–72).

His first full-time university presidency was at the Binghamton University, 1972–74.  He was the eleventh president of the University of Minnesota, serving from 1974 to 1984.  From 1985 to 1991 he was  president of the University of Missouri System.   From 1992 to 2005 he was president of the National Association of State Universities and Land Grant Colleges.  Beginning in 2006, he served as senior advisor to the College Board.  On July 8, 2008, was named interim president of West Virginia University.

On January 2, 2010, while vacationing in New Zealand, his wife Deborah Howell, an editor for The Washington Post, died after being hit by a car.

On May 20, 2010, State University of New York (SUNY) Chancellor Nancy Zimpher nominated Magrath to return as interim president to Binghamton University (previously known as SUNY Binghamton).  He assumed the office on July 1 after confirmation by the SUNY Board of Trustees.

References

External links
 The Journal of the C. Peter Magrath Center in Sibiu, Romania – East-West Cultural Passage: 
 University of Minnesota Office of the President: 

American academic administrators
Cornell University alumni
Presidents of the University of Minnesota
Presidents of the University of Missouri System
1933 births
Living people
Presidents of West Virginia University
Presidents of Binghamton University
Binghamton University faculty
Chancellors of the University of Nebraska-Lincoln